Live in Japan '78 is a 1978 live album by Count Basie and his orchestra.

Track listing
"The Heat's On" (Sammy Nestico) – 3:13
"Freckle Face" (Nestico) – 5:39
"Ja-Da" (Bob Carlton) – 5:28
"Things Ain't What They Used to Be" (Mercer Ellington, Ted Persons) – 3:56
"A Bit of This and a Bit of That" (Count Basie, Wood) – 3:41
"All of Me" (Gerald Marks, Seymour Simons) – 3:06
"Shiny Stockings" (Frank Foster) – 4:37
"Left Hand Funk" (Nestico, Jeff Steinberg) – 5:51
"John the III" (Bobby Plater) – 3:56
"Basie" (Ernie Wilkins) – 4:52
"Black Velvet" (Illinois Jacquet, Nestico) – 3:54
"Jumpin' at the Woodside" (Basie, Jon Hendricks) – 3:20

Personnel
The Count Basie Orchestra
 Count Basie - piano
 Sonny Cohn - trumpet
 Pete Minger - trumpet
 Waymon Reed - trumpet
 Nolan Shaheed - trumpet
 Dennis Wilson - trombone
 Alonzo Wesley Jr. - trombone
 Bill Hughes - trombone
 Mel Wanzo - trombone
 Bobby Plater - alto saxophone
 Danny Turner - alto saxophone
 Eric Dixon - tenor saxophone, flute
 Kenny Hing - tenor saxophone
 Charlie Fowlkes - baritone saxophone
 John Clayton - double bass
 Freddie Green - guitar
 Mickey Roker - drums

References

1978 live albums
Count Basie Orchestra live albums
Pablo Records live albums
Albums produced by Norman Granz